This is the list of all Hapoel Be'er Sheva F.C.'s European matches.

History
Hapoel Be'er Sheva's European history began with the 1976 Intertoto Cup. They won their first match against Danish club Køge BK. Hapoel Be'er Sheva qualified three times to the Europa League group stage in seasons 2016–17 , 2017–18 and 2020–21.

Overall record

Matches

Results

Hapoel Be'er Sheva in the group stages

Europa League

2020–21 Group C

2017–18 Group G

2016–17 Group K

Europa Conference League

2022–23 Group C

Hapoel Be'er Sheva in European knockout phases

Europa League

2016–17 – Round of 32

UEFA Team Ranking
 Bold row separators indicate change of ranking system.
 Italic font indicate ongoing season.

References

Hapoel Be'er Sheva F.C.
Israeli football clubs in international competitions